On 20 March 2016, a Tata Hispano passenger bus carrying Erasmus students from several countries came from the Fallas Festival in Valencia to Barcelona collided with a car on the Autopista AP-7 motorway, near the town of Freginals. Thirteen died – all of them young female students.

Emergency services confirmed that the students on the affected bus were from 20 countries or territories: France, the Netherlands, Finland, Hungary, Germany, Sweden, Norway, Switzerland, the Czech Republic, New Zealand, Great Britain, Italy, Peru, Bulgaria, Macedonia, Poland, Ireland, the Palestinian territories, Japan and Ukraine.

References 

2016 in Catalonia
2016 road incidents in Europe
Bus incidents in Spain
March 2016 events in Spain